Étienne Bausch (17 June 1901 – 25 January 1970) was a Luxembourgian footballer. He competed in the men's tournament at the 1924 Summer Olympics.

References

External links
 

1901 births
1970 deaths
Luxembourgian footballers
Luxembourg international footballers
Olympic footballers of Luxembourg
Footballers at the 1924 Summer Olympics
People from Differdange
Association football goalkeepers